The Assam laughingthrush (Trochalopteron chrysopterum) is a species of bird in the family Leiothrichidae. It is found in Northeast India and adjacent southwest China and Myanmar.

The species was formerly regarded as a subspecies of the chestnut-crowned laughingthrush, T. erythrocephalum.

References

Assam laughingthrush
Birds of Northeast India
Assam laughingthrush